José Luis González China (born 3 June 1966) is a Mexican football manager and former defender. He is currently the manager of Coras Tepic in the Ascenso MX. Previously he was the assistant of José Guadalupe Cruz, for Atlante F.C.

Early career

González China made his Primera División debut on 8 February 1986 for Deportivo Neza with a 5–1 victory over Club León.

During his career he had many position changes. He started as a winger or attacking midfielder under managers Ricardo La Volpe and Rafael Puente, but finished his career as a sweeper.

International goals

|- bgcolor=#bcdfec
| 1. || April 8, 1980 || Toluca, Mexico ||  || 5–0 || Win || Friendly
|- bgcolor=#f2e4d0
| 2. || August 24, 1980 || Sydney, Australia ||  || 2–2 || Draw || Friendly
|- bgcolor=#bcdfec
| 3. || August 30, 1980 || Suva, Fiji ||  || 0–2 || Win || Friendly
|- bgcolor=#f2e4d0
| 4. || November 9, 1980  || Mexico City, Mexico ||  || 5–1 || Win || 1982 FIFA World Cup qualification
|- bgcolor=#bcdfec
|}

U-17 Mexico National Team

In a press conference on 15 February 2009 the Mexican Football Federation presented Juan Carlos Chávez and José Luis Gonzalez China as the new managers for the Mexico national team youth squads, after the departure of Jesús Ramírez to Club América. They were given the task to qualify for the 2009 FIFA U-20 World Cup in Egypt. After the qualification rounds Chávez would manage the U-20 team, González China the U-17 and Raúl Gutiérrez the U-15 team.

References

External links
International statistics at http://www.femexfut.org.mx/

1966 births
Living people
Atlante F.C. footballers
Coyotes Neza footballers
Club León footballers
C.D. Veracruz footballers
Atlas F.C. footballers
Mexico international footballers
Mexican football managers
Toros Neza footballers
Footballers from Mexico City
Mexican footballers
Association football defenders